A lingual sound may be a:
Coronal consonant
Lingual ingressive consonant